Dame Joan Augusta Sawyer, DBE, PC (born 26 November 1940) is a Bahamian judge. She was Chief Justice of the Bahamas from 1996 to 2001 and President of the Court of Appeal of the Bahamas from 2001 to 2010. She was the first woman to ever serve in those two positions.

Career

As a member of the Honourable Society of Gray's Inn Sawyer was called to the English Bar on 19 July 1973 and to the Bahamas Bar two months later. Her career began in 1958 as a clerk-trainee at what is now the Ministry of Public Works. She was named a Justice of the Supreme Court of the Bahamas on 6 May 1988, and served in that position until 30 June 1995. She returned to the bench on 1 November 1996 as Chief Justice, where she sat until 26 November 2001.

She then became President of the Court of Appeal; she retired from that position on 26 November 2010, her 70th birthday, and was succeeded by Anita Allen, the second woman to hold the job. She is also a member of the Indian Council of Jurists.

Personal life and education

Sawyer was born in George Town, Exuma, The Bahamas. She received her early education at the George Town Public School, Government High School, Aquinas College and the Government High School Evening Institute. She did her LL.B. at the University of London, and then went on to The College of Law in 1970. She was married to the late Geoffrey Sawyer; they had one son, Samuel Anthony Sawyer.

References

1940 births
Alumni of the University of London
Chief justices of the Bahamas
Presidents of the Court of Appeal of the Bahamas
Dames Commander of the Order of the British Empire
Living people
Women judges
Bahamian Anglicans
People from Exuma
Women chief justices
Members of the Privy Council of the United Kingdom
20th-century Bahamian lawyers